Community transit may refer to:
The community transit procedure (now Union transit) within the European Union Customs Union
Community Transit in Snohomish County, Washington State